Sauri may be,
Name as in wife of sun 
Sauri language
Magali Sauri
Pekka Sauri
Casa Sauri